Steven Michael Everitt (born August 21, 1970) is a former American football player. He played college football as a center for the University of Michigan from 1989 to 1992. He played professional football as a center and offensive guard in the National Football League (NFL) for seven seasons, including 46 games for the Cleveland Browns from 1993 to 1995 and 45 games for the Philadelphia Eagles from 1997 to 1999.

Early years
Everitt was born in Miami, Florida, in 1970. He attended Southridge High School in Miami. He graduated in 1988 and is part of their "Hall of Fame".

University of Michigan
Everitt enrolled at the University of Michigan in 1988 and played college football as a center for the Michigan Wolverines football teams from 1989 to 1992. As a freshman, Everitt started all 12 games at center for the 1989 Michigan Wolverines football team that compiled a 10-2 record in Bo Schembechler's last season as Michigan's head coach. He then shared the starting center role with Matt Elliott during the 1990 and 1991 seasons. As a senior, he started all 12 games for the undefeated 1992 Michigan team that compiled a 9-0-3 record, outscored opponents 389-198, and defeated Washington in the 1993 Rose Bowl. He was selected as a first-team player on the 1992 All-Big Ten Conference football team.

Professional football
Everitt was selected by the Cleveland Browns in the first round with 14th overall pick of the 1993 NFL Draft. He played three seasons for the Browns from 1993 to 1995, appearing in 46 games, including 45 games at the team's starting center. After the Browns moved to Baltimore in 1996 Everitt was fined $5,000 by the league for wearing a Browns bandana with his Ravens uniform, which he did in protest of the team's relocation . He appeared in eight games for the Ravens in 1996.

In March 1997, Everitt signed a five-year $11.5 million contract with the Philadelphia Eagles. He spent three years with the Eagles, appearing in 45 games as the team's starting center. In April 2000, Everitt was released by the Eagles.

In June 2000, Everitt signed a two-year contract with the St. Louis Rams. He appeared in only four games for the Rams, one as a starter, and all during the 2000 NFL season.

In eight years in the NFL, Everitt appeared in 103 games, 98 of them as a starter, and registered five fumble recoveries.

References

1970 births
Living people
American football centers
Baltimore Ravens players
Cleveland Browns players
Michigan Wolverines football players
Philadelphia Eagles players
St. Louis Rams players
Miami Southridge Senior High School alumni
Players of American football from Miami